Tabu is an Indian actress. She has mainly acted in Hindi films, though she has also starred in numerous Telugu, Tamil, Malayalam, Marathi and Bengali language films, as well as Hollywood films. She has won the National Film Award for Best Actress twice, and holds the record for the most wins for the Filmfare Award for Best Actress (Critics) with four. Other than Best Actress category, she has received Filmfare Awards in Best Female Debut, Best Actress, Best Supporting Actress, Best Actress (Tamil) and Best Actress (Telugu) categories.

Despite a few exceptions, Tabu is best known for acting in artistic, low-budget films that go on to garner more critical appreciation than substantial box office figures. Her appearances in commercially successful films include films such as Border (1997), Saajan Chale Sasural (1996), Biwi No.1 and Hum Saath-Saath Hain: We Stand United (1999). Her most notable performances include Maachis (1996), Virasat (1997), Hu Tu Tu (1999), Astitva (2000), Chandni Bar (2001), Maqbool (2003) and Cheeni Kum (2007). Her leading role in Mira Nair's American film The Namesake also drew major praise. She also co-starred in Ang Lee's film Life of Pi (2012), which was widely acclaimed.

Regarded as one of the most talented Indian female actors of her generation, Tabu is known to be selective about her film roles and has once said, "I do films which move me and most of all, the unit and the director should appeal to me." She was awarded the Padma Shri, India's fourth highest civilian award, in 2011 by the Government of India for her contributions towards the arts. At the 17th Indian Film Festival of Los Angeles she was honored with "Opening Night Tribute", in 2019.

Alliance of Women Film Journalists 
The Alliance of Women Film Journalists (AWFJ) is a non-profit organization founded in 2006. It is based in New York City and is dedicated to supporting work by and about women in the film industry.

Asian Film Awards 
The Asian Film Awards are presented annually by the Hong Kong International Film Festival Society to members of Asian cinema.

Asiavision Awards 
The Asiavision Awards have been held annually since 2006 to honor the artistes and technicians of Indian cinema and television.

Bengal Film Journalists' Association Awards
The Bengal Film Journalists' Association Awards were founded by the oldest Association of Film critics in 1937. It is one of the most prestigious awards held in India.

BIG Star Entertainment Awards 
The BIG Star Entertainment Awards is an annual event organised by the Reliance Broadcast Network.

Bollywood Movie Awards 
The Bollywood Movie Awards were presented annually by The Bollywood Group beginning in 1999. They were discontinued after 2007.

Filmfare Awards 
Established in 1954, the Filmfare Awards are presented annually by The Times Group to members of the Hindi film industry.

Filmfare Awards South 
The Filmfare Awards South is the South Indian segment of the annual Filmfare Awards, presented by The Times Group to honour both artistic and technical excellence of professionals in the South Indian film industry. The awards are separately given for Kannada, Tamil, Telugu and Malayalam films.

Indian Film Festival of Melbourne 
The Indian Film Festival of Melbourne (IFFM) is an annual Indian film festival based in Melbourne, Australia. It is presented by Film Victoria and the State Government of Victoria, and produced by Mind Blowing Films, a Melbourne-based distributor of Indian cinema across Australia and New Zealand.

International Indian Film Academy Awards 
The International Indian Film Academy Awards (shortened as IIFA) is an annual international event organised by the Wizcraft International Entertainment Pvt. Ltd. to honour excellence in the Hindi cinema.

National Film Awards 
The National Film Awards are awarded by the Government of India's Directorate of Film Festivals division for achievements in the Indian film industry. Tabu has received two awards.

Producers Guild Film Awards 
The Producers Guild Film Awards (previously knows as Apsara Film & Television Producers Guild Awards) is an annual event originated by the Film Producers Guild of India to recognize excellence in Indian film and television.

Screen Awards 
The Screen Awards are presented annually by Indian Express Limited to honour excellence in Hindi and Marathi cinema.

Stardust Awards 
The Stardust Awards are an annual event organised by Magna Publishing Company Limited.

Zee Cine Awards 
The Zee Cine Awards is an annual award ceremony organised by the Zee Entertainment Enterprises.

Other Awards, Honors and Recognition's

See also 
 Tabu filmography
 List of Indian film actresses

Notes

References

External links 
 List of awards and nominations received by Tabu at the Internet Movie Database

Lists of awards received by Indian actor